James Lanigan (20 April 1910 – 9 March 1992) was an Irish hurler. At club level he played with Thurles Sarsfields and was the All-Ireland Championship-winning captain with the Tipperary senior hurling team in 1937.

Playing career

Lanigan first came to prominence at inter-county level as a member of the Tipperary junior team in 1929 before being drafted onto the senior side for the 1930 Munster Championship. He won his first All-Ireland medal in his debut year after Tipperary's victory over Dublin in the final. Lanigan captained the team to All-Ireland success in 1937 after lining out at right wing-back in the defeat of Kilkenny at FitzGerald Stadium. His other hurling honours include two Munster Championships, nine senior county championship medals, including five as captain, with Thurles Sarsfields and Railway Cup medal as captain of Munster.

Later life and death

Lanigan, who remained unmarried throughout his life, worked as a fitter in his native Thurles. He died aged 81 on 9 March 1992 after being involved in a traffic collision.

Honours

Thurles Sarsfields
Tipperary Senior Hurling Championship (9): 1929, 1935 (c), 1936 (c), 1938 (c), 1939 (c), 1942 (c), 1944, 1945, 1946

Tipperary
All-Ireland Senior Hurling Championship (2): 1930, 1937 (c)
Munster Senior Hurling Championship (2): 1930, 1937 (c)

Munster
Railway Cup (1): 1938 (c)

References

1910 births
1992 deaths
Thurles Sarsfields hurlers
Tipperary inter-county hurlers
Munster inter-provincial hurlers
All-Ireland Senior Hurling Championship winners